This article shows the roster of all participating teams at the 2022 Women's U19 Volleyball European Championship.

Pool I

North Macedonia 
The following is the North Macedonia roster in the 2022 Women's U19 Volleyball European Championship.

Head coach: Stefan Paunovic

Poland 
The following is the Poland roster in the 2022 Women's U19 Volleyball European Championship.

Head coach: Wiesław Popik

Italy 
The following is the Italy roster in the 2022 Women's U19 Volleyball European Championship.

Head coach: Marco Mencarelli

Slovenia 
The following is the Slovenia roster in the 2022 Women's U19 Volleyball European Championship.

Head coach: Samo Miklavc

Greece 
The following is the Greece roster in the 2022 Women's U19 Volleyball European Championship.

Head coach: Anestis Giannakopoulos

Finland 
The following is the Finland roster in the 2022 Women's U19 Volleyball European Championship.

Head coach: Nikolas Buser

Pool II

Turkey 
The following is the Turkey roster in the 2022 Women's U19 Volleyball European Championship.

Head coach: Reşat Yazıcıoğulları

Serbia 
The following is the Serbia roster in the 2022 Women's U19 Volleyball European Championship.

Head coach: Vladimir Vasović

Croatia 
The following is the Croatia roster in the 2022 Women's U19 Volleyball European Championship.

Head coach: Saša Ivanišević

Romania 
The following is the Romania roster in the 2022 Women's U19 Volleyball European Championship.

Head coach: Marius Macarie

Switzerland 
The following is the Switzerland roster in the 2022 Women's U19 Volleyball European Championship.

Head coach: Frieder Strohm

Netherlands 
The following is the Netherlands roster in the 2022 Women's U19 Volleyball European Championship.

Head coach: Eric Meijer

References 

Women's Junior European Volleyball Championship